A shoal is a sandbank or reef creating shallow water, especially where it forms a hazard to shipping.

Shoal, shoals or shoaling may also refer to:

Locations
 The Shoals, a region in northwest Alabama, United States
 Shoals, Indiana, a town in the United States

Science
 Wave shoaling, the change of wave height for sea waves propagating into shallow water
 Shoaling and schooling, ways that fish and other aquatic animals behave when in large groups

Other
 Project Shoal, an underground nuclear test
 Project Shoal (software), a java based scalable dynamic clustering framework.
 Shoal draught (or draft), of a boat with shallow draught which can pass over some shoals: see Draft (hull)

See also
 Shoals (disambiguation)
 Shoal Creek (disambiguation)